Wicked Game is a compilation album by American singer and songwriter Chris Isaak, released in 1991 by WEA on the Reprise Records label in the UK, Europe and Australia. The record contains 11 songs from his first three albums.

In early 1991, after the song "Wicked Game" went top 10 in the UK and top 15 in Australia, a division of Warner Music Group, WEA released the album Wicked Game. Compiled by Phil Knox-Roberts of WEA UK, it was highlights of Isaak's recording career to that point. Three of the songs were taken from his first album Silvertone (1985): "Dancin, "Voodoo" and "Funeral in the Rain", four from his 1986 album, Chris Isaak: "Blue Hotel", "Lie to Me", "Heart Full of Soul" (a cover of The Yardbirds 1965 top 10 hit) and "You Owe Me Some Kind of Love" and four from 1989's Heart Shaped World: - "Wicked Game", "Nothing's Changed", "Blue Spanish Sky" and "Heart Shaped World". An instrumental version of the song "Wicked Game" was included as a bonus track. The album was released on CD and LP. "Blue Hotel" was re-released as a single in support of the album, reaching #17 in the UK and #23 in Australia. 

Warner Music Canada eventually added Wicked Game to their regular CD catalogue after years of it being a steady import seller. 

A compilation of five videos of Isaak's songs was released, including "Wicked Game" (directed by Herb Ritts), "Dancin (Mary Lambert), "You Owe Me Some Kind of Love" (Jean-Baptiste Mondino), "Blue Hotel" (Mark Lebon) and "Don't Make Me Dream About You" (Geoffrey Barish). "Don't Make Me Dream About You" from Heart Shaped World was not included on the Wicked Game album.

Track listing
All tracks written by Chris Isaak, except where noted.
 "Wicked Game"
 "You Owe Me Some Kind of Love"
 "Blue Spanish Sky"
 "Heart Shaped World"
 "Heart Full of Soul" (Graham Gouldman)
 "Funeral in the Rain"
 "Blue Hotel"
 "Dancin
 "Nothing's Changed"
 "Voodoo"
 "Lie to Me"
 "Wicked Game" (Instrumental)

Charts

Weekly charts

Year-end charts

Certifications and sales

References

Chris Isaak albums
1998 compilation albums
Reprise Records compilation albums
Albums produced by Erik Jacobsen